Desman may refer to:

Desman, a snouted and naked-tailed diving insectivore of the tribe Desmanini
Pyrenean desman
Russian desman, also known as Desmana
Shawn Desman, Canadian singer